Amdoxovir is a pharmaceutical drug that has undergone research for the treatment of HIV/AIDS. It acts as a nucleoside reverse transcriptase inhibitor (NRTI). The drug was discovered by Raymond F. Schinazi (Emory University) and C.K. Chu (University of Georgia) and developed by RFS Pharma.

Amdoxovir was in advanced Phase II clinical trials around 2010. In 2013, a Phase II trial was terminated and another was withdrawn before it started. No further studies appear to have been done.

References

Nucleoside analog reverse transcriptase inhibitors
Purines
Dioxolanes
Experimental drugs
Hydroxymethyl compounds